The Berne Thaler was a coin equivalent to the French silver écu (German: laubthaler) issued by the Swiss canton of Bern. It contained 26.67 g fine silver and was valued at 4 livres.

The currency of Bern was the livre (later, franc or frank), divided into 10 batzen or 40 kreuzer.

The laubthaler or écu was also equivalent to 4 franken of the Helvetic Republic, and afterwards to 4 Berne franken and 4 Vaud francs.

Coins

The  Kreuzer coins were inscribed as 1 Vierer. Additionally, French écus were counterstamped '40 BZ' (40 batzen) in Bern for local use.

References

External links 

Modern obsolete currencies
Currencies of Switzerland
1798 disestablishments
Canton of Bern